A rack lift is a type of elevator which consists of a cage attached to vertical rails affixed to the walls of a tower or shaft and which is propelled up and down by means of an electric motor which drives a pinion gear that engages a rack gear which is also attached to the wall between the rails.

References

Elevators